Mikołajów  is a village in the administrative district of Gmina Osiek, within Staszów County, Świętokrzyskie Voivodeship, in south-central Poland.

The village has a population of  4.

Demography 
According to the 2002 Poland census, there were 13 people residing in Mikołajów village, of whom 61.5% were male and 38.5% were female. In the village, the population was spread out, with 7.6% from the age of 18 to 44, 46.2% from 45 to 64, and 46.2% who were 65 years of age or older.
 Figure 1. Population pyramid of village in 2002 – by age group and sex

Former parts of village – physiographic objects 
In the years 1970 of last age, sorted and prepared out list part of names of localities for Mikołajów, what you can see in table 3.

References

Villages in Staszów County